Amod is a town and capital of a taluka in Bharuch district, Gujarat, India. It is situated about a mile south of the Dhadhar River. on the NH 228 road (the "Dandi heritage route") between Bharuch and Jambusar.

Economy 
The income of the estate was about ₨72,000, compared with the income of Amod municipality (established 1890) of ₨6,100.

See also
Sigam

References

Cities and towns in Bharuch district